Théo Kemp (25 September 1931 – 4 June 2010) was a Luxembourgian footballer. He played in one match for the Luxembourg national football team in 1957. He was also part of Luxembourg's team for their qualification matches for the 1954 FIFA World Cup.

References

External links
 

1931 births
2010 deaths
Luxembourgian footballers
Luxembourg international footballers
Place of birth missing
Association footballers not categorized by position